Voorst is a village in the Dutch province of Gelderland. It is located in the municipality of Oude IJsselstreek, about 3 km east of the town of Gendringen.

It was first mentioned in 1329 as Forsto, and is the name of a manor house.

References

Populated places in Gelderland
Oude IJsselstreek